Banhados do Delta do Jacuí Biological Reserve is a biological reserve in the Jacuí River delta in Rio Grande do Sul, Brazil.

History

The Jacuí Delta State Park  was established on 14 January 1976.
The islands of Pólvora and Pombas were designated as a Biological Reserve, and other areas could be expropriated.
The park covered .
It is located in the Porto Alegre metropolitan region in the municipalities of Eldorado do Sul, Nova Santa Rita, Canoas, Triunfo, Charqueadas and Porto Alegre.

The state park's limits were redefined on 11 November 2005.
The outcome was that the APA, which covers  including privately-owned land, supports the use of natural resources in a sustainable manner according to a management plan.
The State Park portion, which covers  all of which is publicly owned, aims to preserve the natural landscape and ecosystem for scientific, educational and recreational use.

Environment

The area containing the biological reserve is a water complex formed by the rivers Caí, Sinos, Gravataí and Jacuí, which form Lake Guaíba.
There are thirty islands and mainland areas.
Where the rivers meet the Gravataí is heavily polluted by urbanization and industry, and the Caí and Sinos are heavily polluted by environmental waste.
The boundaries of the islands are constantly shifting.
The vegetation is typical of wetlands in the region.
Despite the proximity to the city, endangered species are found in the delta including otter, capybara and broad-snouted caiman.

Notes

Sources

1976 establishments in Brazil
Biological reserves of Brazil
Protected areas of Rio Grande do Sul
Protected areas established in 1976